Sam Darley (born 15 February 1993) is a former professional Australian rules footballer who played for the Greater Western Sydney Giants and Western Bulldogs in the Australian Football League (AFL He was one of the 's. Darley made his debut in round 8, 2012, against  at the Gabba.

He played his first match for the Western Bulldogs in round 15, 2014 against . The Bulldogs defeated the Demons by 6 points, marking Darley's first win at AFL level. He played a further four games in 2014, kicking his first goal for the Bulldogs against  in round 20.

He was delisted at the conclusion of the 2015 AFL season.

Darley later began playing with the Richmond Football Club's reserves side in the VFL, where he captained the team to the 2017 grand final.

Darley returned to the North Hobart Football Club for the 2019 TSL season.

References

External links

1993 births
Living people
Greater Western Sydney Giants players
Western Bulldogs players
Australian rules footballers from Tasmania
North Hobart Football Club players